In chemical engineering, process design is the choice and sequencing of units for desired physical and/or chemical transformation of materials. Process design is central to chemical engineering, and it can be considered to be the summit of that field, bringing together all of the field's components.

Process design can be the design of new facilities or it can be the modification or expansion of existing facilities.  The design starts at a conceptual level and ultimately ends in the form of fabrication and construction plans.

Process design is distinct from equipment design, which is closer in spirit to the design of unit operations.  Processes often include many unit operations.

Documentation
Process design documents serve to define the design and they ensure that the design components fit together.  They are useful in communicating ideas and plans to other engineers involved with the design, to external regulatory agencies, to equipment vendors and to construction contractors.

In order of increasing detail, process design documents include:
Block flow diagrams (BFD): Very simple diagrams composed of rectangles and lines indicating major material or energy flows.
Process flow diagrams (PFD): Typically more complex  diagrams of major unit operations as well as flow lines.  They usually include a material balance, and sometimes an energy balance, showing typical or design flowrates, stream compositions, and stream and equipment pressures and temperatures.
Piping and instrumentation diagrams (P&ID): Diagrams showing each and every pipeline with piping class (carbon steel or stainless steel) and pipe size (diameter). They also show valving along with instrument locations and process control schemes.
Specifications: Written design requirements of all major equipment items.

Process designers typically write operating manuals on how to start-up, operate and shut-down the process.  They often also develop accident plans and projections of process operation on the environment.

Documents are maintained after construction of the process facility for the operating personnel to refer to.  The documents also are useful when modifications to the facility are planned.

A primary method of developing the process documents is process flowsheeting.

Design considerations
There are several considerations that need to be made when designing any chemical process unit. Design conceptualization and considerations can begin once product purities, yields, and throughput rates are all defined.

Objectives that a design may strive to include:
Throughput rate
Process yield
Product purity

Constraints include:
Capital cost: the amount of budget or investment to construct end to end process.
Available space: the area of the land to build the plant.
 Safety concerns: consideration towards risk analysis on industrial accidents or hazardous chemicals.
Environmental impact and projected effluents and emissions
Waste production/recycling: manage waste produced as side product of the process for not to harm the surroundings.
Operating and maintenance costs: represent the variable cost of the operational of the plant.

Other factors that designers may include are:
Reliability
Redundancy
Flexibility
Anticipated variability in feed stock and allowable variability in product.

Sources of design information
Designers usually do not start from scratch, especially for complex projects.  Often the engineers have pilot plant data available or data from full-scale operating facilities.  Other sources of information include proprietary design criteria provided by process licensors, published scientific data, laboratory experiments, and suppliers of feedstocks and utilities.

Design process
Design starts with process synthesis - the choice of technology and combinations of industrial units to achieve goals.  More detailed design proceeds as other engineers and stakeholders sign off on each stage: conceptual to detailed design.

Simulation software is often used by design engineers.  Simulations can identify weaknesses in designs and allow engineers to choose better alternatives.  However, engineers still rely on heuristics, intuition, and experience when designing a process.  Human creativity is an element in complex designs.

See also

 Chemical engineer
 Chemical plant
 Chemical process
 Process integration
 Process simulation
 Chemical process modeling
 Environmental engineering
 Industrial process
 List of chemical process simulators
 Process engineering
 Process safety
 Unit process

Recommended chemical engineering books

References

External links
Chemical Process Design Open Textbook (Northwestern University by Fengqi You)

A General Framework for Process Synthesis, Integration, and Intensification (OSTI / Texas A&M University)

Process engineering